Steven Milne Cooper (born 14 December 1955) is an English former professional footballer who played as a forward.

Career
Born in Stourbridge, Cooper played for Stourbridge, Torquay United and Saltash United.

References

1955 births
Living people
English footballers
Stourbridge F.C. players
Torquay United F.C. players
Saltash United F.C. players
English Football League players
Association football forwards